Julius Ludwig Friedrich Runge (28 June 1843, Röbel – 14 March 1922, Lindau) was a German landscape painter. Born in Röbel in northern Germany, he studied under Hans Gude and Gustav Schönleber. He painted in Munich, Karlsruhe, Hamburg and Lindau. In the early 1880s, he joined the Skagen Painters in the far north of Jutland together with his Swedish tutor Wilhelm von Gegerfelt and his French colleague Émile Barau.

References

External links

1843 births
1922 deaths
German marine artists
People from Mecklenburgische Seenplatte (district)
Skagen Painters
20th-century German painters
20th-century German male artists
German male painters